Zetton (ゼットン), stylized "ZETTON", is a Japanese hiphop record producer who emerged in 1996 from the underground hip hop scene in Fukuoka, Japan.  Zetton is also the chief executive officer of Inside Muzic and Studio Lb12.

He is known for producing Rowshi and Brown Sugar, who made a lot of hit records. His production can also be found on major artists such as Nitro Microphone Underground, HI-D, Juju, Kana Nishino, Miliyah Iliyah Kato, Super-Junior-K.R.Y, Exile Atsushi, Generations, and Sandaime J Soul Brothers from Exile Tribe.

Biography 
1996 started his career as "Zetton" 
2004 built his own studio "Studio Lb12"
2007 established Takaki Shoten/Inside-Muzic with Rowshi
2016 He release his new instrumental album "Beatz Hustler"
2016 "R.O.B" 7th instrumental album has out without announcement

Discography

CD (5 titles) 
『The Beat maker』
 Remix CD off of M.O.P, Talib Kweli, Anthony Hamilton, Game, Common
『The Beat maker 001』(2006)
『The Beat maker -R&B remix- 002』(2006)
『The Beat maker - 3Maeme Remix - 003』(2006)
『The Beat maker 004』(2006)
『da beat breaker 005』(2007)
『Beatz Hustler』(2016)
『R.O.B』(2016)

LP Record (4 titles) 
『Mo Better EP』
Remix (12 inch vinyl) off of The Beatnuts, Pharcyde, Kool G Rap, Nas sold at Juno Record in UK
『Mo Better EP 001』Zetton (2007)
『Mo Better EP 002』Common Remixes (2007)
『Mo Better EP 003』Zetton x Bach Logic (2008)
『Mo Better EP 004』Zetton x Smith (2008)

Single and album produced

References

External links 
 Nichion
 Inside Muzic

Hip hop record producers
Japanese producers
Living people
1980 births